Vil may refer to 

People
Vil Mirzayanov (born 1935), Soviet-born American chemical weapons expert 
Guy Saint-Vil (born 1942), Haitian football forward
Melissa St. Vil (born 1983), Haitian-American boxer

Media
Cruella de Vil, a character from the 1956 novel The Hundred and One Dalmatians
Jeg vil, a 2008 song by Danish singer Basim
Vil Ambu, 2016 Indian Tamil-language action film 

Other
VIL (disambiguation)
Villa Vil, a village and municipality in Argentina
garrote vil, a strangling weapon